Complimentary may refer to:

Compliment (disambiguation)
 Complimentary language and gender
Free of charge

See also
Complementary (disambiguation)